Aleksandar Mandić (born 1988) is a politician in Serbia. He has served in the Assembly of Vojvodina since 2020 as a member of the Serbian Progressive Party.

Private career
Mandić has a bachelor's degree in economics. He lives in Pećinci.

Politician
Mandić was president of the village council of Šimanovci in Pećinci prior to his election to the provincial legislature.

He was given the fifty-eighth position on the Progressive-led Aleksandar Vučić — For Our Children electoral list in the 2020 Vojvodina provincial election and was elected when the list won a majority victory with seventy-six out of 120 mandates. He now is a member of the committee on national equality and the committee on organization of administration and local self-government.

References

1988 births
Living people
People from Pećinci
Members of the Assembly of Vojvodina
Serbian Progressive Party politicians